Still Got It Made is the 2004 album by the rapper Special Ed, his fourth album.

Track listing
Special
N.Y.C.
Really
Bouncin'
Who's the Man
Smile
All Night, All Day
I Know You
Kryptonite
We Gon Ride
Somebody Gotta Bleed
Dying Young
So Long, Goodbye

References

2004 albums
Special Ed albums
Albums produced by Howie Tee
Albums produced by Mark Sparks
Albums produced by Soopafly